In Rainbows – From the Basement is a 2008 live video by the English rock band Radiohead. It features performances of ten songs from Radiohead's seventh album, In Rainbows (2007), plus four older songs.

Production
In Rainbows – From the Basement was filmed in one day, with sound by Radiohead's producer Nigel Godrich and video direction by David Barnard at the Hospital studio in Covent Garden, London. It was the first episode of the second series of Godrich's series From the Basement. Radiohead performed songs from their 2007 album In Rainbows, plus three from Hail to the Thief (2003) and one from Kid A (2000).

Release
In Rainbows – From the Basement premiered on Saturday, 3 May 2008 on VH1. It was later released on iTunes and released on disc with a special edition of In Rainbows in Japan. In 2020, Radiohead uploaded the performance to YouTube. It was followed in 2011 by The King of Limbs: Live From the Basement.

Track listing
The following are the 10 videos available for purchase on iTunes:
"15 Step"  – 3:56
"Bodysnatchers"  – 4:16
"House of Cards"  – 5:29
"Bangers & Mash"  – 3:31
"Videotape"  – 4:47
"Reckoner"  – 5:03
"Go Slowly"  – 3:54
"All I Need"  – 4:21
"Nude"  – 4:21
"Weird Fishes/Arpeggi"  – 5:20
Additional songs originally streamed on the VH1 broadcast include:

 "Where I End And You Begin"
 "Optimistic"
 "The Gloaming"
 "Myxomatosis"

Personnel
Ed O'Brien – guitar, FX, percussion, backing vocals
Colin Greenwood – bass guitar, keyboard, percussion
Jonny Greenwood – guitar, laptop, keyboard, percussion, glockenspiel
Philip Selway – drums, percussion
Thom Yorke – vocals, guitar, piano, keyboard, drums

References

External links
From The Basement Official Website

ITunes-exclusive releases
Radiohead video albums
Live video albums
2008 video albums
2008 live albums
Radiohead live albums
Albums produced by Nigel Godrich
Art pop albums